National Community Renaissance, also known as National CORE, is a U.S. non-profit community builder specializing in affordable, multifamily, mixed-income, senior, workforce and special needs housing. Based in Rancho Cucamonga, California, National CORE operates in three states: California, Florida, and Texas. The company is one of the largest national nonprofit developers of affordable housing in the United States, with more than 9,000 units. National CORE develops, owns and manages units. Its Hope through Housing Foundation – also a non-profit organization – provides social services such as preschool and after school programs, senior wellness, violence prevention, economic advancement and financial literacy.

National CORE consistently ranks among the 40 largest affordable housing owners – for-profit or nonprofit – in the United States. National CORE has a staff of approximately 400 employees, and serves more than 27,000 family and senior residents. Its assets total more than $850 million.

History 
National CORE traces its roots to 1992, when homebuilders Jeffrey Burum and Andrew B. Wright founded the non-profit Southern California Housing to provide affordable housing for an underserved population. Seven years later, National Housing was founded to expand the organization's reach. In 2006, the two units were merge to create a single non-profit, National Community Renaissance.

The company has been a pioneer in the development of non-profit housing in the United States. In 1996, the organization's Heritage Pointe community in Rancho Cucamonga became the first affordable housing development in the U.S. built completely in-house by a nonprofit.

Steve PonTell, founder of the La Jolla Institute, was named National CORE's Chief Executive Officer in 2012.  PonTell has become a leading voice on housing affordability and is a frequent contributor to the Orange County Register, Southern California News Group  and other publications.

National CORE plays a major role in several of the more notable community development projects in Southern California. The company serves as master developer of the Arrowhead Grove Neighborhood Revitalization effort on the site of the former Waterman Gardens public housing project in San Bernardino. The multimillion-dollar redevelopment plan calls for more than 400 housing units, and is being credited with transforming one of the city's most challenged neighborhoods. National CORE also is a partner in the development of Mission Cove in San Diego County, California. That project will consist of 288 affordable housing units in one of the most expensive counties in the United States.

Hope through Housing Foundation 
In 1998, the organization created the Hope through Housing Foundation as a separate 501(c)3 to provide services and raise funds to support programs for residents and communities. Since its founding, Hope through Housing has provided more than 2 million hours in supportive services.

Hope through Housing also is based in Rancho Cucamonga, California. Gregory Bradbard serves as its President.

Awards 
In 2016, National CORE received the Supportive Housing Project of the Year Award from the Southern California Association of Nonprofit Housing for its Marv's Place community in Pasadena, California. Marv's Place houses formerly homeless individuals and families.

In 2015, its Dumosa Senior Village community in Yucca Valley, California, received the Best 50-plus Senior Independent Living Community award from the National Association of Home Builders (NAB). Other awards received by National CORE by NAB include the Best Workforce Housing Community (2013) for the Alta Vista Apartments in East Los Angeles, Best Creative Financing of an Affordable Apartment (2012 and 2010) for Encanto Court in South Central Los Angeles and San Marino Senior Apartments in San Marino, California and Best Green Building Concepts (2011) for Vista Dunes Courtyard Homes in La Quinta, California.

National CORE also has been honored by the National Association of Housing and Redevelopment Officials, the National League of Cities, the Urban Land Institute and Multi-Housing News.

In 2016, Marv's Place, Vista Dunes and the first phase of Arrowhead Grove (Valencia Vista) received Platinum LEED certification from the U.S. Green Building Council.

References

External links 
 

American companies established in 1992
1992 establishments in California
Housing in the United States